The 2011 Latvian Individual Speedway Championship was the 37th Latvian Individual Speedway Championship season. The final took place on 21 August 2011 in Daugavpils, Latvia.

Results
 August 21, 2011
  Daugavpils

Speedway in Latvia
2011 in Latvian sport
2011 in speedway